Charles H. Kegel (August 16, 1924 – April  1981)  was a professor in the Department of Communication Skills at Michigan State University and in the Department of English at Idaho State University. He served as editor of the Rocky Mountain Review of Language and Literature in 1959 and as acting President of Idaho State  University from 1975 to 1976.

References

Presidents of Idaho State University
1924 births
1981 deaths
Michigan State University faculty
20th-century American academics